The 1980 Winter Paralympic Games, the second Winter Paralympics, were held from 1  to 7 February 1980 in Geilo, Norway. Eighteen countries took part with 299 athletes. A demonstration event was held in sledge downhill racing. All classes of athletes with locomotor disabilities were able to participate. Organized by the International Stoke Mandeville Games Federation (ISMGF) and the International Sports Federation of the Disabled (ISOD).

Originally known as the 2nd Olympic Winter Games for Disabled.

Sports
 Alpine skiing
 Ice sledge speed racing
 Cross-country skiing
Sledge Downhill racing (demonstration event)

Medal table

The top 10 NPCs by number of gold medals are listed below. The host nation (Norway) is highlighted.

Participating nations
Eighteen nations participated in the 1980 Winter Paralympics. Australia, Denmark, Italy and New Zealand made their debut appearances. Belgium and Poland didn't send any athletes.

 (Host nation)

See also

 1980 Winter Olympics
 1980 Summer Paralympics

References

External links
 Geilo 1980 Paralympic Winter Games - official webpage with participants and results
 Geilo 1980 Official Results - from International Paralympic Committee Historical Results Archive 
 Pictures from the opening of the Games at geilonaturfoto.com

 
Winter Paralympic Games
1980 in Norwegian sport
1980 in multi-sport events
International sports competitions hosted by Norway
Winter multi-sport events in Norway
Hol
February 1980 sports events in Europe